Plebeiogryllus guttiventris is a species of Orthoptera in the family Gryllidae. Two subspecies are recognized. It can be found in India.

References 

Insects described in 1871